Osmodes is an Afrotropical genus of grass skipper butterflies in the family Hesperiidae.

Species
Osmodes adon (Mabille, 1889)
Osmodes adonia Evans, 1937
Osmodes adonides Miller, 1971
Osmodes adosus (Mabille, 1889)
Osmodes banghaasii Holland, 1896
Osmodes costatus Aurivillius, 1896
Osmodes distincta Holland, 1896
Osmodes hollandi Evans, 1937
Osmodes laronia (Hewitson, 1868)
Osmodes lindseyi Miller, 1964
Osmodes lux Holland, 1892
Osmodes minchini Evans, 1937
Osmodes omar Swinhoe, 1916
Osmodes thora (Plötz, 1884)

References

External links
Natural History Museum Lepidoptera genus database
Seitz, A. Die Gross-Schmetterlinge der Erde 13: Die Afrikanischen Tagfalter. Plate XIII 77

Erionotini
Hesperiidae genera